Álex Corretja defeated Marcelo Ríos in the final, 7–5, 7–5, 6–3 to win the men's singles tennis title at the 1997 Italian Open.

Thomas Muster was the defending champion, but lost in the second round to Scott Draper.

Seeds

 Pete Sampras (first round)
 Michael Chang (first round)
 Thomas Muster (second round)
 Yevgeny Kafelnikov (third round)
 Richard Krajicek (second round)
 Goran Ivanišević (semifinals)
 Marcelo Ríos (final)
 Carlos Moyà (third round)
 Wayne Ferreira (first round)
 Álex Corretja (champion)
 Álbert Costa (third round)
 Boris Becker (third round)
 Félix Mantilla (first round)
 Tim Henman (second round)
 Marc Rosset (third round)
 Mark Philippoussis (first round)

Draw

Finals

Top half

Section 1

Section 2

Bottom half

Section 3

Section 4

Qualifying

Qualifying seeds

Qualifiers

Qualifying draw

First qualifier

Second qualifier

Third qualifier

Fourth qualifier

Fifth qualifier

Sixth qualifier

Seventh qualifier

Eighth qualifier

References

External links
 1997 Italian Open draw
 ITF tournament profile

Men's Singles